Vitamin is a series of otome games developed by HuneX and published by D3 Publisher for PlayStation 2, Nintendo DS, Nintendo 3DS, PlayStation Portable, and PlayStation Vita. The first title, VitaminX, was released on March 29, 2007 for PlayStation 2.

A series of official skins were released for the PSP-3000.

A special cafe event, where goods were sold, was held from January 10 to 18, 2015. A different cafe campaign was held in collaboration with  the previous year.

VitaminX Destination, a 2018 PlayStation Vita release following the tenth anniversary of the series, received a Famitsu rating of 8.0.

On April 15, 2018, an event called  was held at the Maihama Amphitheatre celebrating the 10th anniversary of the series, with cast members (including Daisuke Ono) having a talk session, doing quizzes, and performing songs.

Titles 
Vitamin X and limited edition box set (March 29, 2007, PS2)
Vitamin X Evolution (March 27, 2008, NDS)
Vitamin X Evolution Plus and limited edition box set (September 9, 2010, PSP; January 16, 2014 for 3DS; February 22, 2018 for Vita download version)
Vitamin R and limited edition box set (August 8, 2013, PSP)
Mune Kyun Otome Collection Vol. 1: Vitamin X Evolution Plus (July 31, 2014, PSP) A limited promotional clear file was given away with the purchase of this version, which was part of a budget series of re-released otome games.
Mune Kyun Otome Collection Vol. 2: Vitamin X Detective B6 (July 31, 2014, PSP) A limited promotional clear file was given away with the purchase of this version, which was part of a budget series of re-released otome games.
Mune Kyun Otome Collection Vol. 3: Vitamin X to Z (July 31, 2014, PSP) A limited promotional clear file was given away with the purchase of this version, which was part of a budget series of re-released otome games.
Mune Kyun Otome Collection Vol.6: Vitamin Z Revolution (August 7, 2014, PSP)
Mune Kyun Otome Collection Vol. 7: Vitamin Z Graduation (August 7, 2014, PSP)
Vitamin Y (October 30, 2008, NDS)
Vitamin Z and limited edition box set (March 26, 2009, PS2)
Vitamin Z Revolution and limited edition box set (March 25, 2010, PSP; December 12, 2013 for 3DS)
Vitamin Z Graduation and limited edition box set (January 31, 2013, PSP)
Vitamin X to Z and limited edition box set (February 24, 2011, PSP)
Vitamin X: Detective B6 and limited edition box set (February 9, 2012, PSP)
Vitamin X Destination (February 22, 2018, Vita)

Characters/cast

VitaminX Evolution 

Tsubasa Makabe － Tatsuhisa Suzuki

Hajime Kusanagi － Daisuke Ono

Shun Nanase － Kohsuke Toriumi

Kiyoharu Sendo － Hiroyuki Yoshino

Goro Fumonji － Daisuke Kishio

Mizuki Madarame － Hisayoshi Suganuma

Ginji Katsuragi － Tomokazu Sugita

Kōji Ōtori － Kazuhiko Inoue

Tarō Kukage － Kenta Miyake

Hitoshi Nikaido － Yūsei Oda

Shōjirō Kinugasa － Kōki Miyata

Masaki Sanada － Daisuke Sakaguchi

Music CDs 
 VitaminX Original Soundtrack（KDSD-00132）
 RED DISK *Limited time sale item
 BLUE DISC *Limited time sale item
 Character CD
 SILVER DISC **（KDSD-00148）
 GOLD DISC **（KDSD-00147）
 DIAMOND DISC **（KDSD-00149）
 SAPPHIRE DISC -GAM。- (KDSD-228)
 RUBY DISC -Nanakiyo- (KDSD-00215)
 Best Album 〜GREATEST HITS〜(Regular version KDSD-00245, first press )
 **（KDSD-00185）限定版KDSD-00243-244）
 **
 vol.1 ** (LACM-4781)
 vol.2 ** (LACM-4782)
 vol.3 ** (LACM-4786)
 vol.4 ** (LACM-4787)
 Vol.5 ** (LACM-4793)
 Vol.6 ** (LACM-4794)
 OAD VitaminX Addiction
 **(LACM-4841)
 **(LACM-4851) 
 ** (LACM-4852)
 Act.3 ED Seishun Happiness/Goro & Mizuki  (LACM-4853)
 ** (LACA-15163)
 ** (D3PR-25)
 **
 #1 ** (D3PR-29)
 #2 ** (D3PR-31)
 #3 ** (D3PR-33)
 #4 ** (D3PR-35)
 Memories of Vitamin ～opening&ending music box～(D3PR-39)

Drama CDs 
 Ultra Vitamin
 1（KDSD-00133）
2**  
3**   （KDSD-00217）
* 
 PART1（VGCD-0088）
 ** (VGCD-0140）
 **
 1** （MACY-2150）
 2** （MACY-2154）
 Dramatic CD Collection VitaminX
 1**（MACY-2158）
 2**  (MACY-2167)
 ** Limited time sale item
 VANQUISH FORBIDDEN∞LOVE（KDSD-00200）
 **
 1** (MACY-2179)
 2** (MACY-2182)
 **  (VGCD-173)
 ** (VGCD-174)
 ** (KDSD-00391)
 ** 
 1**  (MACY-2188)
 2** (MACY-2189)
 3**  (MACY-2190)
 4**  (MACY-2191)
 5**   (MACY-2194)
 6**   (MACY-2195)
 Dramatic CD Collection VitaminX-Z・Cocktail Vitamin
 1** (MACY-2905)
 2** (MACY-2906)
 3** (MACY-2907)
 4** (MACY-2908)
 5** (MACY-2909)
 6** (MACY-2910)
 ** (LACA-15119)
 VitaminX Detective B6 
 Vol.1 (D3PPR-23)
 Vol.2 (D3PR-24)
 ** (KDSD-00538)
VitaminX×**
 Vol.1 ** (HO-0026)
 Vol.2 ** (HO-0027)
 Vol.3 ** (HO-0028)
 Vol.4 **(HO-0031)

DJ CDs
 Radio CD VitaminX RadioFiction Vol.1 (Regular edition:TBZR-23/Animate limited edition:TBZR-24)
 Radio CD VitaminX RadioFiction Vol.2 (Regular edition:TBZR-106/Animate limited edition:TBZR-107)
 Radio CD VitaminX RadioFiction Vol.3 (Regular edition:TBZR-110/Animate limited edition:TBZR-111)

DVD 
 ** DVD
 ** DVD
 ** DVD
 ** DVD 
 OAD VitaminX Addiction OAD DVD
 Act.1
 Act.2
 Act.3
 ** DVD
 ** DVD
 ** DVD
 5th Anniversary Event of Vitamin Series DVD
 ** DVD

Books 
 **（）
 Vitamin Vanity Collection
 **（）
 **（）
 **（）
 **（）
 **（ASIN B00158RBCQ）
 **（）
 **（ASIN B00M2DLUMK）
 **（）
 **（）

Applications 

A mobile game titled VitaminX -Soine Kareshi- (-Sleep Together Boyfriend-), with optional packs for various characters, was released in 2012, and a second mobile title, Smartphone Kareshi (Smartphone Boyfriend) was released the following January. However, both of the applications appear to have since become unavailable.
For iPhone
(Distribution started October 15, 2012) Microtransactions exist inside application
For Android
* (Distribution started November 29, 2012)
* (Distribution started February 8, 2013)
* (Distribution started February 15, 2013)
* (Distribution started February 25, 2013)
* (Distribution started February 28, 2013)
* (Distribution started March 8, 2013)
For both iPhone and Android
* (Limited time distribution starting from January 29, 2013)
VitaminX LINE Stickers (Distribution started March 12, 2015)

Credit card 
As a collaboration with Mitsui Sumitomo Card, a credit card with a VitaminX design was released on February 22, 2010. On May 18, 2016, applications were opened for a new design. Campaigns were run for both cards.

External links 
 
 VitaminX Official Site
 VitaminX Evolution Official Site
 VitaminY Official Site
 VitaminX Evolution Plus Official Site
 OAD Adaptation Official Site
 TEAM Entertainment CD Information Site
 VitaminX Detective B6 Official Site
VitaminX B6 Kickoff MTG!／VitaminX 10th Anniversary Event Official Page
VitaminX 10th Anniversary Portal Site
VitaminX Destination Official Site
VitaminR at GameFAQs
VitaminX at GameFAQs
VitaminX Destination at GameFAQs
VitaminX: Detective B6 at GameFAQs
VitaminX Evolution at GameFAQs
VitaminX Evolution Plus at GameFAQs
VitaminXtoZ at GameFAQs
VitaminY at GameFAQs
VitaminZ at GameFAQs
VitaminZ Graduation at GameFAQs

References 

2007 video games
2008 video games
2009 video games
2010 video games
2011 video games
2012 video games
2013 video games
PlayStation 2 games
PlayStation Vita games
Nintendo DS games
Nintendo 3DS games
PlayStation Portable games
Video games developed in Japan
Japan-exclusive video games
Otome games
Romance video games
Video games set in Japan
D3 Publisher games
Visual novels
Single-player video games
Video games with alternative versions